Las Tablas is the capital of the Panamanian province of Los Santos, with a population of 9,255 as of 2010. It is located a few kilometres inland from the Gulf of Panama on the Azuero Peninsula. Las Tablas is a recognised national centre of Panamanian folk: Art, music, gastronomy, architecture, culture and literature. The only Panamanian president to serve three terms, Belisario Porras, was from Las Tablas.

It is known for a lively yearly Carnival, in which the city splits into two competing factions, "Calle Arriba" (Uptown, literally "Street Above") and "Calle Abajo" (Downtown / Street Below), both centred on two streets of the same name. Each faction will have a carnival queen, a parade, fireworks, music, a decorated plaza, food stands, presentations, concerts, surveys, games, contests, etc., all attempting to overpower the other faction's efforts.

Etymology

According to folklore, the town takes its name, which translates as "The Boards", from planks of wood salvaged from a Spanish ship used to construct the first houses in the town.   The ship had run aground on the coast near the city's future location after fleeing Panama City before the arrival of Henry Morgan.

References

External links
 Cuna del Folklore Nacional  (Spanish) Retrieved March 27, 2005
Las Tablas Carnival info and pictures

Corregimientos of Los Santos Province
Populated places in Los Santos Province
Gulf of Panama
Panamanian coasts of the Pacific Ocean